Air Vice-Marshal Paul Douglas Luker,  is a former Royal Air Force officer who served as Commander of Joint Helicopter Command from 2002 to 2005.

RAF career
Luker joined the Royal Air Force (RAF) in 1968, trained as a support helicopter pilot and served in Hong Kong, Northern Ireland, the Persian Gulf, the Balkans and Belize. He became Officer Commanding No. 7 Squadron and then Station Commander at RAF Odiham. After attending the Royal College of Defence Studies, he went on to be Director of Overseas Military Activity at the Ministry of Defence in 1998 and then Commander of Joint Helicopter Command in 2002, and latterly served for seven months as Deputy Commanding General of the US-led coalition in Afghanistan before retiring in 2006.

Other interests
From 2006 to 2016 Luker served as Chief Executive of the Council of Reserve Forces' and Cadets' Associations, Secretary General of the UK Reserve Forces Association and, for the final five years acted as Clerk to the RFCA External Scrutiny Team, drafting their annual report to Parliament. He served as Chairman of Blind Veterans UK from 2017 to 2021, and is a Deputy Lieutenant for Hampshire, and Honorary President of the Hampshire & Isle of Wight Wing of the Air Training Corps.

References

1951 births
Companions of the Order of the Bath
Deputy Lieutenants of Hampshire
Living people
Officers of the Order of the British Empire
Recipients of the Air Force Cross (United Kingdom)
Royal Air Force air marshals
Royal Air Force personnel of the Gulf War
Royal Air Force personnel of the War in Afghanistan (2001–2021)